Marcelo Daniel Pérez Maldonado (born 24 June 1994), is a Chilean footballer who last played for Chilean Segunda División side Independiente de Cauquenes as a left-back.

Club career
Marcelo made his debut at UC playing against Audax Italiano in Estadio Bicentenario de La Florida in 2012. Later, on August 7, 2014, Marcelo was loaned to Coquimbo Unido for a year.

References

External links

Marcelo Pérez at playmakerstats.com (English version of ceroacero.es)

1994 births
Living people
People from Santiago
People from Santiago Province, Chile
People from Santiago Metropolitan Region
Footballers from Santiago
Chilean footballers
Club Deportivo Universidad Católica footballers
Coquimbo Unido footballers
Lautaro de Buin footballers
C.D. Arturo Fernández Vial footballers
Independiente de Cauquenes footballers
Primera B de Chile players
Segunda División Profesional de Chile players
Association football defenders